Elmore Auxiliary Field is a former facility of the United States Army Air Forces located in Montgomery, Alabama. Constructed after 1941 as an auxiliary to the nearby Gunter Field, it was redeveloped into Wetumpka Municipal Airport after the war.

See also 

 Alabama World War II Army Airfields
 List of airports in Alabama

References

Airfields of the United States Army Air Forces in Alabama
Airports in Montgomery County, Alabama
Closed installations of the United States Army